John Hanley may refer to:

John Hanley, early resident of Calhoun, Kentucky
John C. Hanley, United States Army general